{{DISPLAYTITLE:C8H6Cl2O3}}
The molecular formula C8H6Cl2O3 (molar mass: 221.03 g/mol) may refer to:

 Dicamba, an herbicide
 2,4-Dichlorophenoxyacetic acid (2,4-D), an herbicide

Molecular formulas